The Roman Catholic Diocese of Los Teques is a diocese located in the city of Los Teques in the Ecclesiastical province of Caracas in Venezuela.

History
On 23 July 1965 Pope Paul VI established the Diocese of Los Teques from the Metropolitan Archdiocese of Caracas.

Bishops

Ordinaries
Juan José Bernal Ortiz (1965.07.25 – 1980.10.19), Archbishop (personal title)
Pío Bello Ricardo, S.J. (1981.01.31 – 1995.12.02)
Mario del Valle Moronta Rodríguez (1995.12.02 – 1999.04.14), appointed Bishop of San Cristóbal de Venezuela    
Ramón Ovidio Pérez Morales (1999.06.05 – 2004.12.30), Archbishop (personal title)
Freddy Jesús Fuenmayor Suárez (2004.12.30 – present)

Auxiliary bishop
Pío Bello Ricardo, S.J. (1977-1981), appointed Bishop here

See also
Roman Catholicism in Venezuela

References

External links
 GCatholic.org
 Catholic Hierarchy 

Roman Catholic dioceses in Venezuela
Roman Catholic Ecclesiastical Province of Caracas, Santiago de Venezuela
Christian organizations established in 1965
Roman Catholic dioceses and prelatures established in the 20th century
1965 establishments in Venezuela
Los Teques